Maya Devi Temple, Haridwar (Hindi: माया देवी मंदिर, हरिद्वार) is a Hindu temple dedicated to goddess Maya in the holy city of Haridwar of Uttarakhand state in India. It is believed that the heart and navel of goddess Sati fell in the region where the temple stands today and thus it is sometimes referred to as a Shakti Peetha.

Goddess Maya is the Adhisthatri deity of Haridwar. She is a three-headed and four-armed deity who is believed to be an incarnation of Shakti. Haridwar was previously known as Mayapuri in reverence to this deity. The temple is a Siddh Peetha which are the places of worship where desires get fulfilled. It is one of three such Peethas located in Haridwar, the other two being Chandi Devi Temple and Mansa Devi Temple.

Description
The temple dates back to the eleventh century. It is one of the three ancient temples of Haridwar which are still intact, the other two being Narayana-shila and Bhairava Temple. The inner shrine consists of murtis (icons) of goddesses Maya in the centre, Kali on the left, Kamakhya on the right. There are also two other goddesses who are also forms of Shakti, present in the inner shrine. The temple is located to the east of Har ki Pauri and is easily accessible by buses and auto rickshaws. It is regarded as a must visit for devotees going to Haridwar.

The temple is visited by many devotees from various parts of the country especially during the Navratra and the Kumbha Mela in Haridwar.

References

Shakti temples
Hindu temples in Uttarakhand
Buildings and structures in Haridwar